Budapesti Vasutas Sport Club is a water polo club from Budapest, Hungary. The team competes in the Országos Bajnokság I.

Naming history
 Budapesti Lokomotív (Bp. Lokomotív): (1949 –1954)
 Bp. Törekvés: (1955 – 1956)
 Budapesti Vasutas Sport Club (BVSC): (1957 – 1991/92)
 BVSC-Schiller Opel: (1991/92 – 1992/93) - the first naming sponsor
 BVSC-Westel: (1992/93 – 1997/98)
 BVSC-Brendon: (1997/98 – 2003/04)
 BVSC-Turbo: (2003/04 – 2004/05)
 BVSC: (2004/05 – 2007/08)
 BVSC-Atlantis Casino: (2007/08 – 2008/09)
 BVSC-Zugló: (2008/09 – 2013/14)
 BVSC-Wáberer Hungária-Zugló: (2013/14 – 2015/16)
 BVSC-Zugló: (2015/16)
 MKB-Euroleasing-BVSC-Zugló: (2016/17 – 2017/18)
 BVSC-Zugló: (2018/19 – ... )

Honours

Domestic competitions
Országos Bajnokság I (National Championship of Hungary)
 Champions (7): 1966, 1984–85, 1986–87, 1995–96, 1996–97, 1997–98, 1998–99

Magyar Kupa (National Cup of Hungary)
 Winners (5): 1982, 1986–87, 1994–95, 1999–00, 2002–03

Szuperkupa (Super Cup of Hungary); 
 Winners: 2003

European competitions 
LEN Champions League (Champions Cup)
Runners-up (1): 1985–86

LEN Euro Cup
Semi-finalist (1): 2001–02

LEN Cup Winners' Cup
Runners-up (2): 1983–84, 1995–96

Current squad
Season 2017–18

Staff

Recent seasons

 Cancelled due to the COVID-19 pandemic.

In European competition
Participations in Champions League (European Cup, Euroleague): 8x
Participations in Euro Cup (LEN Cup): 5x
Participations in Cup Winners' Cup: 1x

Notable former players

Olympic champions
György Horkai – 15 years (1970-1985)  1976 Montreal
Ferenc Konrád – 9 years (1956-1965)  1976 Montreal
Zoltán Szécsi – 9 years (1995-2004)  2000 Sydney, 2004 Athens, 2008 Beijing
János Konrád – 7 years (1956-1963)  1964 Tokyo
Zsolt Varga – 7 years (1990-1997)  2000 Sydney
Tamás Märcz – 7 years (1993-2000)  2000 Sydney
Gábor Kis – 7 years (1997-2004)  2008 Beijing
György Gerendás – 4 years (1983-1987)  1976 Montreal
Gergely Kiss – 4 years (1986-1990)  2000 Sydney, 2004 Athens, 2008 Beijing
Tamás Faragó – 3 years (1965-1968)  1976 Montreal
Norbert Madaras – ? years ( -2001)  2004 Athens, 2008 Beijing
Norbert Hosnyánszky – half year (1994)  2008 Beijing

Former coaches

 Károly Laky
 Dezső Gyarmati (1981–1988)
 Tamás Faragó (1990–1992)
 György Gerendás (1992–2004)

 Balázs Vincze ( –2010)
 Norbert Dabrowski (2010–2013)
 Tamás Märcz (2013–2016)
 Levente Szűcs (2017– present)

References

External links
 

Water polo
Sport in Budapest
Water polo clubs in Hungary